Shahram Nikbakht Bidgoli (Sean Nikbakht; Persian: شهرام نیکبخت بیدگلی) is an Iranian professional bodybuilder. In March 2016, he placed first in the Men's Physique Masters (Over 40) division of the 2016 NPC MuscleContest Championships. He went on to place highly in other bodybuilding competitions.

Career
Shahram Nikbakht was born on June 23, 1970, in Tehran. He started his sports activity in 1986 with wrestling, continuing in 1996, as a bodybuilding coach. He was appointed as the coach of Iran's national wrestling teams in 1999.

He has a master's degree in physical education and has completed several coaching and fitness courses in Italy and Germany.

Shahram Nikbakht has participated in more than 25 competitions, including the Athens Olympics, and events in the United States, Hungary, Iran, and Azerbaijan. His success as a professional bodybuilder has led to many product endorsements and other opportunities in his career.

Bodybuilding Titles

Coaching
This professional bodybuilder has worked with the Wrestling Federation from 2000 to 2010 as a bodybuilding coach for the youth and adult freestyle and western wrestling teams. His coaching records include:

See also 
Shahram Nikbakht was appointed the head of the Professional Bodybuilding Committee of the Iranian Bodybuilding Association in early 2020.

References

External links

Official website
Linkedin
Facebook
Head of Professional Bodybuilding Committee
NPCNews

1970 births
Living people
Iranian bodybuilders
Wrestling coaches
Sportspeople from Tehran